Eric Butorac and Jamie Murray were the defending champions. They were both present but did not compete together.
Butorac partnered with Todd Perry, but lost in the first round to Scott Lipsky and David Martin.
Murray partnered with Max Mirnyi, but lost in the first round to Thomas Johansson and Robert Lindstedt.

Mahesh Bhupathi and Mark Knowles won in the final 7–6(7–5), 6–2, against Sanchai Ratiwatana and Sonchat Ratiwatana.

Seeds

Draw

Draw

External links
 Draw

Regions Morgan Keegan Championships - Doubles
2008 Regions Morgan Keegan Championships and the Cellular South Cup
2008 in sports in Tennessee